The 1948 Campeonato Paulista da Primeira Divisão, organized by the Federação Paulista de Futebol, was the 47th season of São Paulo's top professional football league. São Paulo won the title for the 5th time. no teams were relegated and the top scorer was Ypiranga's Silas with 19 goals.

Championship
The championship was disputed in a double-round robin system, with the team with the most points winning the title.

Top Scores

References

Campeonato Paulista seasons
Paulista